Gatipotuzumab is a humanized monoclonal antibody recognizing the tumor-specific epitope of mucin-1 (TA-MUC1), enabling it to differentiate between tumor MUC1 and non-tumor MUC1 epitopes. Gatipotuzumab is being developed by Glycotope GMBH  and is undergoing a phase II clinical trial for ovarian cancer.

References

External links 
 

Monoclonal antibodies
Experimental drugs